Carolynn is a given name that is an alternate spelling of Carol, a derivative of Caroline and a variation of Carolyn. Notable people known by this name include the following:

Carolynn Marie Hill, known as Lynn Hill (born 1961), American rock climber
Carolynn Jackson, co-founder of Spec's Wine, Spirits & Finer Foods
Carolynn Sells (born 1973), British motorcycle racer,

Mary Carolynn Tucker, full name of Mary Tucker (born 2001), American sports shooter

See also

Carolann
Carolyn
Carolyne
Carolynne